Space operation service (short: SOS ; also: space operation radiocommunication service) is – according to Article 1.23 of the International Telecommunication Union's (ITU) Radio Regulations (RR)
– defined as A radiocommunication service concerned exclusively with the operation of spacecraft, in particular space tracking, space telemetry and space telecommand. These functions will normally be provided within the service in which the space station is operating.

Frequency allocation
The allocation of radio frequencies is provided according to Article 5 of the ITU Radio Regulations (edition 2012).

In order to improve harmonisation in spectrum utilisation, the majority of service-allocations stipulated in this document were incorporated in national Tables of Frequency Allocations and Utilisations which is with-in the responsibility of the appropriate national administration. The allocation might be primary, secondary, exclusive, and shared.
primary allocation:  is indicated by writing in capital letters (see example below)
secondary allocation: is indicated by small letters
exclusive or shared utilization: is within the responsibility of administrations 

 Example of frequency allocation

See also 
 Radio station
 Radiocommunication service

References / sources 

 International Telecommunication Union (ITU)

Radiocommunication services ITU